Columbio, officially the Municipality of Columbio (Maguindanaon: Inged nu Columbio), is a 1st class municipality in Sultan Kudarat, Philippines. According to the 2020 census, it has a population of 33,527 people.

History
The municipality of Columbio was transferred from Cotabato Province to Province of Sultan Kudarat on November 22, 1973, by presidential decree 341  by President Ferdinand E. Marcos.

Geography

Barangays
Columbio is politically subdivided into 16 barangays.

Climate

Demographics

Columbio is inhabited by ethnic groups such as the Ilocanos, Ilonggos, Blaan and Maguindanaon. Ilocanos and Ilonggos are the only inhabitants of the town not native to Mindanao.

Economy

References

External links
Columbio Profile at PhilAtlas.com
  Columbio Profile at the DTI Cities and Municipalities Competitive Index
[ Philippine Standard Geographic Code]
Philippine Census Information
Local Governance Performance Management System

Municipalities of Sultan Kudarat